The Marine Military Academy is a private college preparatory academy located in Harlingen, Texas, US, offering a college preparatory curriculum for boys in grades 7–12 plus one year of post-graduate study. The school was founded in 1965. Its traditions and ideals are inspired by the United States Marine Corps (USMC), but the school is not affiliated with the USMC except through its Junior ROTC program.

The academy is situated on the site of the former Harlingen Army Airfield, established in 1941. After closing, the field was re-opened in 1952 as the Harlingen Air Force Base which closed in the early 1960s. Since opening its doors as the Marine Military Academy most of the original buildings have been replaced with modern facilities. The adjacent runways became the Valley International Airport.

Academics
Courses offered include regular high school classes as well as honors courses, Advanced Placement authorized courses and dual enrollment courses for which college credit may be earned. Most courses are taught year-long.

Cadets have required attendance at tutorials if they are failing any classes. There are no make-ups for failed exams or missed homework assignments without acceptable reasons and mandatory Closed Call to Quarters (time set aside each evening in the barracks for the completion of homework and studying for exams).

The school has summer programs including a four-week hell summer camp for boys 13–17, as well as ESL classes for foreign students.

Athletics
All cadets are required to participate in one of the offered extracurricular activities during the afternoon activity period which goes from approximately 4:00–5:30 P.M. The goal of the program is to provide all cadets an opportunity to participate in sports activities regardless of their skill level. Additional athletic activities conducted at the school include judo, boxing, rock climbing, cycling, PFT team, and drill.

Beginning with the 2000–2001 school year, varsity sports began competing in the Texas Association of Private and Parochial Schools (T.A.P.P.S.) for statewide honors. Also offered at the eighth grade level is the V.I.S.A. program (Valley Independent School Association), with yearlong competition in various sports. As they are not permitted to participate in TAPPS competitive activities until they reach grade nine, this program provides eighth graders the opportunity to participate in volleyball, basketball, soccer and track and field sports against other member private schools.

Corps of cadets
The Marine Military Academy established one of the first Marine Corps Junior Reserve Officers' Training Corps (MCJROTC) in the nation. All cadets are members of the MCJROTC unit, unless they fail to qualify for full membership because of age or citizenship. In this case they receive the training as associate members.

Cadets are assigned to one of five company barracks, supervised by a drill instructor and assistant drill instructor. Introductory training lasts for four weeks, during which new cadets are taught varied general military skills and knowledge. These include military rank structure, uniforms, close order drill. They also undergo training on rappelling, a confidence course, obstacle course and high ropes course. Introductory training, also called the plebe system, is supervised by cadet NCOs serving as cadet instructors, who are supervised by a cadet officer, usually the public affairs officer or executive officer of the company. A parade is held at the end of the training during which the plebes place the Eagle, Globe, and Anchor on their garrison cover to symbolize the transformation from plebe to cadet.

Cadets come from various cultural backgrounds, including students from approximately forty-one states and eight foreign countries. Cadets from Mexico make up the largest complement of international students, but the school includes cadets from China.

Rank structure
The cadet rank structure is based on the United States Marine Corps rank and billet system, with the addition of Cadet before the title.

Eighth grade students cannot advance beyond Cadet Lance Corporal, and freshmen cannot exceed the rank of Cadet Corporal. However, eighth graders and freshmen more often serve as non-rates, those ranks up to c/Lance Corporal that are not non-commissioned officers. As a sophomore, a cadet may be promoted to an NCO rank. Juniors make up most of the Academy's staff NCOs.

Seniors are generally promoted to officer rank. They hold positions of command responsibility, as Platoon Commanders, Company Executive Officers, Company Commanders, Battalion Executive Officers, and Battalion Commanders. There are also many other Battalion Staff and Company Staff positions available for seniors not in billets of command.

Uniforms
Uniforms authorized for wear at the academy are parallel to those of the United States Marine Corps. During school days, the uniforms worn on weekdays are the Utility and Green "C" uniforms. Four days a week the prescribed uniform is Utility and on Fridays the Green "C" uniform is worn if authorized by the Commandant of Cadets. During periods of exercise PT Gear is worn. The Dress Blue uniforms are often preserved for the Marine Corps Birthday Ball and periods of Leave. Raincoats and Letter jackets may also be worn when directed during cold or rainy weather. The Pistol belt can be worn in lieu of a Web belt when a cadet is in a "duty status" or, in certain situations, a cadet officer/noncommissioned officer. Cadet officers are also permitted to wear the Pistol belt while wearing the Dress Blue "A" and "B" uniforms. The blood stripe is no longer sewn into cadet Dress Blue pants.

Cadets are required to wear the uniform of the day at all times while enrolled (with the exception of leave) at the academy. In certain situations, however, such as community service events and other extracurricular activities, civilian dress may be authorized.

Usage
Since there are many varying cadet uniforms, certain events dictate which uniform is appropriate. For example, Dress Blue "A" is rarely worn. The school holds two specific events that require Blue "A": the Marine Corps Birthday Ball and The HM Smith Foundation dinner. Both Dress Blue "A" and "B" may be worn to civilian occasions which dictate white tie or black tie. Green "C"'s are issued at the QM during entrance into the school for events off campus, including liberty on weekends and special leave.

Class “A” Alpha and Class “B” Bravo

The Academy authorizes the class “A” and class “B” uniforms for events considered “Black tie” and leave home during times of academy departure. The class “A” and “B” uniforms consist of,

A Frame Cap with A White Cover and gold EGA devices 
A white undershirt 
A blue coat with red piping, gold buttons and Golden EGA devices
Blue trousers 
Black corfam dress shoes
Golden rank pins
A white belt with gold buckle (Cadet enlisted only, officer will wear a black fair belt)
A Black Name Tag with the cadets last name on it over the left breast pocket

Medals, Ribbons (Only worn with ribbons if in class “B” uniform) marksmanship badges, academic wreaths, pilots wings, NJHS torches and GPA stars may be worn above the right breast pocket. If the cadet has any activity specific pins (drill pin, rotary team pin, etc.) he may wear it on his right breast pocket.

Blood stripes are no longer authorized for use by cadets due to concerns of stolen valor and demotion. Demotion would mean a C/Ssgt that was demoted to C/Cpl would have to remove the blood stripe from his trousers, leaving a stitch line on them and requiring the cadet to buy new trousers.

Class “C” Charlie and Class “D”Delta

The Academy authorizes the class “C” and class “D” uniforms for events such as weekend liberty, special leave and leave home  during times of academy departure. The class “C” and “D” uniforms consist of,

A Brown Garrison Cap with a black EGA
A beige button up shirt 
Blue Trousers (Class “D” Only)
Brown Trousers 
Black corfam dress shoes 
Shirt stays (boot bands may be used in lieu of shirt stays)
A white undershirt 
A MCJROTC patch on the upper left arm
A Company Letter on the left Breast Pocket flap 
A black name tag with the cadets name on it 1/8th of an inch above the left  breast pocket
Rank Pins (for cadet PFCs and above) on the collar 
A tan web belt

Ribbons, marksmanship badges, academic wreaths, pilots wings, NJHS torches and GPA stars may be worn above the right breast pocket. If the cadet has any activity specific pins (drill pin, rotary team pin, etc.) he may wear it on his right breast pocket.

Utility “U” and “U-1” Uniform

The Academy authorizes the Utility “U-1” and “U” Uniforms for wear during the school day. It cannot be worn during times of liberty, special leave, or leave home during times of academy departure. The Utility “U” and “U-1” Uniforms consist of,

A Woodland MARPAT 8 Point Cover 
A Woodland MARPAT blouse with “MCJROTC” Branch style patch and a name tape with the cadets last name on it
Woodland MARPAT trousers with a tape indicating the cadets last name over the left back pocket 
Brown Socks
Boot bands
Coyote Brown Combat Boots
A Green Undershirt 
Company T-shirt (only worn with the Utility “U” Uniform on mondays)
A Company Letter on the left breast pocket flap
Rank Pins on collar

Pilot Wings can be worn on the Utility “U-1” uniform above the right breast pocket

Officers, SNCOs and NCOs may wear a rank pin indicating their rank on their cover while wearing the Utility “U” uniform (also known as “Boots and Yutes”)

PT and PT-1 Uniform

The PT and PT-1 uniforms are authorized for times of physical activity, rest and relaxation and barracks liberty. The PT and PT-1 Uniforms Consist of,

A Yellow Dry-Fit T-shirt with cadets name and the seal of the school
Red dry-fit Shorts with cadets name and seal of school 
White Ankle Socks 
Issued PT Shoes or Personal Tennis shoes 
Black Camelbak with cadets name and laundry number on front (Worn with PT-1)
Red MMA ballcap with EGA and “Marine Military Academy” embroidered on the front (PT-1)

PT-1 is the main uniform of summer campers for the summer camp

Controversy
The Academy has been the subject of some controversy regarding its supervision of cadets on campus. Beginning in 1995, parents began a class action for hazing, abuse, and lack of supervision.  Debra Wayne organized a group of over 100 parents of cadets to join together against the environment.   Debra Wayne began criminal and civil action. The two cadets who committed the attack were discovered, arrested and charged.  Both were dealt with through the Texas judicial system.  The Wayne case was settled out of court in 2002.

Since the incident the school has improved security by installing room locks, adding video security systems and hiring additional adult supervision in the barracks.

Iwo Jima monument

The Iwo Jima monument, located on the Marine Military Academy grounds, is the original model, a creation of Dr. Felix de Weldon, and was used for the casting of the monument erected at Arlington National Cemetery. After completion of the monument, this sculpture was placed in storage until the early 1980s when its creator donated it to the Marine Military Academy. Donations were collected to fund the transport and reassembly of the monument, which was supervised by Dr. de Weldon. On April 16, 1982, the monument was officially dedicated. The Marine Military Academy is also the final resting place of Corporal Harlon Block, formerly a resident of Weslaco, Texas, one of the Marines immortalized in the famous photo of the flag-raising on Iwo Jima from which the sculpture is modeled.

Notable alumni
 George S. Bowman Jr., Major general in the Marine Corps and later Superintendent of the Academy 1972-1979
 Dale Hellestrae, former NFL player
 Edward H. Hurst, Brigadier general in the Marine Corps and later Superintendent of the Academy 1968-1972
 Maj Gen Wayne Rollings, past President of the Academy
 Walter Stauffer McIlhenny, Brigadier general in the Marine Corps and benefactor of the Academy

See also
Peacock Military Academy
TMI Episcopal
Texas Marine Corps

References

External links
 Marine Military Academy
 History of military schools in the US
 Veterans Day
 History of Marine Corps JROTC

Buildings and structures in Harlingen, Texas
Educational institutions established in 1965
Military high schools in the United States
High schools in Cameron County, Texas
Organizations associated with the United States Marine Corps
Private high schools in Texas
Private middle schools in Texas
Preparatory schools in Texas
Military schools in Texas
Private boarding schools in Texas
1965 establishments in Texas